Derzhavin is a crater on Mercury. It has a diameter of 156 kilometers. Its name was adopted by the International Astronomical Union in 1979. Derzhavin is named for the Russian poet Gavril Derzhavin, who lived from 1743 to 1816.

Hollows
Hollows are present on the west side of Derzhavin crater.

References

Impact craters on Mercury